Al-Farooq (also spelled El-Farouk, Al Farouk or Al-Faruq) may refer to:

People
Umar, Muslim caliph and companion of Muhammad, known as Al-Faruq ("Distinguisher between truth and false")
Farooqi and Farooq, surnames
Al-Farooq (book), biography of Umar by Shibli Nomani
Al-Farouq Aminu, American basketball player for the Portland Trail Blazers
El-Farouk Khaki, Canadian lawyer
Omar al-Faruq (1971–2006), Al-Qaeda member
Farouk of Egypt
Farrokh Bulsara, better known as Freddie Mercury, British singer-songwriter

Places
Al Farouq training camp, an alleged Al-Qaeda training camp near Kandahar, Afghanistan
Al Farouk de Tombouctou, football (soccer) team in Mali
Dar Al-Farooq Islamic Center, in Bloomington, Minnesota

Other uses
Al-Farooq (title)
Farouq Brigades, a unit of the Free Syrian Army in the Syrian civil war

See also
Farooq (disambiguation)